Kabomo Vilakazi (born 27 July 1978), or simply as Kabomo, is a South African actor and singer.

He is best known for the roles in the films and television serials: Zabalaza, Sink and Seriously Single. Apart from acting, he is also a writer, poet, editor, musician, rapper, producer and an artist manager.

Personal life
He was born on 27 July 1978 in Benoni, Gauteng.

Career
Kabomo's first single, "Uzobuya", was released in 2012. Success came with two albums, All Things Grey and Sekusile. In the soap opera Zabalaza, he played a minor role, which led to an invitation to play the starring role in the Vuzu sitcom Check Coast in 2014. In 2015, he appeared in the film Sink, then in the television serial Sober Companion, followed by appearances in popular shows such as Soul City, Scandal, Thola, Saints & Sinners, Umlilo, Captain Bozaa and Tshisa.

As a songwriter, he made several popular songs for the singers: Tshepo Tshola, Unathi, Aya, Kelly Khumalo, Thiwe, Nothende, Flabba, The Fridge, Flatoe, Pebbles, Zubz, Dineo Moeketsi. He also directed two feature films: Droplets and Melody. Meanwhile, he also wrote the script for the popular Sepedi SABC1 drama series Skeem Sam. However he was later criticized by the Droplets film crew stating that he has not paid them.

In August 2020, he starred in the comedy film Seriously Single co-directed by Katleho Ramaphakela and Rethabile Ramaphakela. It was released on 31 July 2020 on Netflix.

Television serials
 Check Coast as Bheka Zonke		
 Rhythm City as Robert		
 Generations as Pastor Zondo		
 Scandal as Doctor Ndaba		
 Zabalaza as Herbert		
 Sober Companion as KG		
 The Republic as Minister of Finance		
 The Mayor as Pastor		
 Thola as Sam		
 Jozi Street as Dingaan

Filmography

References

External links
 

Living people
21st-century South African male actors
South African male film actors
South African male television actors
1978 births
People from Benoni